Rafik Boujedra (born 27 July 1993) is a professional footballer who plays as a attacking midfielder for Valence. Born in France, he is a former Tunisia youth international.

Club career
After making his debut in the French lower divisions with his hometown club Valence, Boujedra joined Gazélec Ajaccio in 2013, while the club was in the third division. He made his full professional debut a year later, setting-up the second goal in a 2–0 Ligue 2 victory over Valenciennes.

International career 
Boujedra was called up to the Tunisia U23 national team for a friendly against Qatar in 2013.

Honours 
Le Puy

 Championnat National 2: 2021–22

Notes

References

External links
 
 
 Rafik Boujedra foot-national.com Profile

1993 births
Living people
Sportspeople from Valence, Drôme
Citizens of Tunisia through descent
Footballers from Auvergne-Rhône-Alpes
French sportspeople of Tunisian descent
Tunisian footballers
French footballers
Association football midfielders
Ligue 2 players
Championnat National players
Championnat National 2 players
Olympique de Valence players
Gazélec Ajaccio players
Football Bourg-en-Bresse Péronnas 01 players
US Quevilly-Rouen Métropole players
Le Puy Foot 43 Auvergne players